is a Japanese voice actor and singer affiliated with Across Entertainment and Lantis. He is best known for voicing Teru Tendo in The Idolmaster SideM, Issei Kuga in TsukiPro, and Tomoki Takashima in Young Disease Outburst Boy.

Biography
Shugo Nakamura, the youngest of four sons, was born on 28 July 1988 in Okinawa Prefecture, and moved to Tokyo after graduating high school. He became interested in music as a junior high school student, and he was a vocalist and guitarist for a local band. Although he intended to be a musician there, he decided to pursue an acting career after watching a stage performance, and he was subsequently educated at R&A Voice Actors Academy.

In 2015, he was cast as Teru Tendo in the SideM installment of The Idolmaster franchise, and subsequently appeared in both its anime television adaptation and the Wakeatte Mini! spinoff. His nickname  came from the idea of a listener to SideM's radio show, 315 Pro Night.

In 2016, Nakamura appeared as Issei Kuga in Quell, one of four musical groups in Tsukino Talent Production's TsukiPro idol anime. His character's tie-in single, SQ QUELL Kachōfūgetsu "Hana"-hen, was released on 23 March 2018, and it charted at #41 on the Oricon Singles Chart on 2 April.

In July 2019, Nakamura was cast as Tomoki Takashima in Young Disease Outburst Boy, the anime adaptation of the vocaloid song of the same name. The ending song of the anime, Here Comes The Sun, was Nakamura's first single; it was released on 30 October 2019, and it charted at #11 on the Oricon Singles Chart on 11 November. On 16 February 2020, Nakamura's second single, Colorful, was announced to be released on 11 March 2020.

Nakamura was one of four male voice actors who won the Best New Actor Award at the 13th Seiyu Awards in 2019. Nakamura ranked in second place at the 2017-2018 Newtype Anime Awards.

Filmography

Anime series
2016
 Magi: Adventure of Sinbad as Knight
 Fastening Days 2 as Delivery Boy

2017
 The Idolmaster SideM as Teru Tendo
 TsukiPro the Animation as Issei Kuga

2018
 Zombie Land Saga as Newcomer

2019
 Young Disease Outburst Boy as Tomoki Takashima

2020
 Warlords of Sigrdrifa as Sou Ikeme

2022
 Game World Reincarnation as Spica Diafell (on-air version)
 Blue Lock as Gin Gagamaru
 Eternal Boys as Kento Takanashi

2023
 The Ice Guy and His Cool Female Colleague as Katori-kun
 Technoroid Overmind as Zin
 Opus Colors as Yuichi Shido

Anime films
2022
 Toku Touken Ranbu: Hanamaru ~Setsugetsuka~ as Chatannakiri
 The First Slam Dunk as Ryota Miyagi

Video games
2015
 Touken Ranbu as Chatannakiri
2018
 Caligula Effect: Overdose as Stork

References

External links
 Profile at Lantis
 
 

Japanese male video game actors
Japanese male voice actors
Male voice actors from Okinawa Prefecture
1988 births
Living people
Japanese male pop singers
Across Entertainment voice actors
Lantis (company) artists
Dramatic Stars members
21st-century Japanese male actors
21st-century Japanese male singers
21st-century Japanese singers